Isabella "Belle" Mary Moore (23 October 1894 – 7 March 1975), later known by her married name Belle Cameron, was a Scottish  competitive swimmer who represented Great Britain in the Olympics.

At the 1912 Summer Olympics in Stockholm, Sweden, Moore won a gold medal as a member of the first-place British women's team in the 4×100-metre freestyle relay, together with teammates Jennie Fletcher, Annie Speirs and Irene Steer.  The British women set a new world record in the event of 5:52.8, beating the German and Austrian women's relay teams by a wide margin.  Swedish King Gustav V presented Moore and her teammates with their gold medals and Olympic laurels.

Moore was trained as a longer-distance swimmer, but only 100-metre swimming events were available for women at the 1912 Olympics; she was eliminated in the semi-finals of the women's 100-metre freestyle.  At 17 years and 226 days old, she remains the youngest British woman to win an Olympic gold medal; she is also the only Scottish woman to win an Olympic gold medal in swimming.

Moore was born the eighth child of nine in her family.  She started training in early age and by 17 already worked as a swimming instructor.  In 1919, she married George Cameron, a naval architect; together they moved to Maryland, United States, where Moore gave birth to a daughter, Doris, and son, George.  She spent the rest of her life in Maryland where she taught swimming to thousands of children.  She was posthumously inducted into the International Swimming Hall of Fame as an "Honor Pioneer Swimmer" in 1989.

See also
 List of members of the International Swimming Hall of Fame
 List of Olympic medalists in swimming (women)
 World record progression 4 × 100 metres freestyle relay

References

External links
 

1894 births
1975 deaths
Scottish female freestyle swimmers
World record setters in swimming
Medalists at the 1912 Summer Olympics
Olympic gold medallists for Great Britain
Olympic swimmers of Great Britain
Scottish emigrants to the United States
Scottish Olympic medallists
Scottish female swimmers
Sportspeople from Glasgow
Swimmers at the 1912 Summer Olympics
Olympic gold medalists in swimming